Shauna Ramdyhan (born 1989 in Georgetown, Guyana) is a Guyanese beauty pageant titleholder who was crowned Miss Guyana 2015 and represented her country at Miss Universe 2015 in Las Vegas, United States.

Personal life
Ramdehan lives in Georgetown, Guyana and works as a Foreign Services Officer in the Ministry of Foreign Affairs. On 16 November 2015 Ramdyhan was crowned Miss Universe Guyana 2015. As Miss Guyana, Ramdyhan competed at Miss Universe 2015, representing Guyana.

References

Living people
Guyanese beauty pageant winners
1989 births
Miss Universe 2015 contestants
People from Georgetown, Guyana